South Fork West Mancos River is a tributary of the West Mancos River in Montezuma County, Colorado. The river flows from a source in the Owen Basin of the San Juan National Forest to a confluence with the North Fork that forms the West Mancos River.

See also
List of rivers of Colorado
List of tributaries of the Colorado River

References

Rivers of Colorado
Rivers of Montezuma County, Colorado
Tributaries of the Colorado River in Colorado